Thomas Cullum Pyatt (born February 14, 1987) is a Canadian former professional ice hockey centre. He spent most of his career in the National Hockey League (NHL) with the Montreal Canadiens, Tampa Bay Lightning and Ottawa Senators. Pyatt also played in the National League (NL) with Genève-Servette HC and the SC Rapperswil-Jona Lakers and in the Swedish Hockey League (SHL) with Skellefteå AIK.

He is the son of former NHL player Nelson Pyatt and brother of retired hockey player Taylor Pyatt.

Playing career

Junior
Pyatt grew up playing for the Thunder Bay Kings AAA program in his hometown of Thunder Bay, Ontario, with New York Rangers defenceman Marc Staal.  He began his major junior career in 2003–04, having been drafted in the second round, 21st overall in the 2003 OHL Priority Selection by the Saginaw Spirit.  After a 48-point season with the Spirit in his second OHL season, he was drafted 107th overall in the 2005 NHL Entry Draft by the New York Rangers.

Upon being drafted, he returned to the OHL for two more seasons.  Towards the end of an 81-point campaign for Pyatt in his fourth and final major junior season in 2006–07, the Rangers signed him to a three-year, entry-level contract on March 12, 2007.  At the end of the season, he was awarded the William Hanley Trophy as the OHL's Most Sportsmanlike Player after accumulating just 18 penalty minutes.

Professional
Pyatt split his rookie professional season in 2007–08 with the Rangers' minor league affiliates, the Hartford Wolf Pack of the American Hockey League (AHL), tallying 14 points in 41 games, and Charlotte Checkers of the ECHL, tallying 15 points in 16 games.

On June 30, 2009, Pyatt was traded from the New York Rangers, along with Scott Gomez and Michael Busto, to the Montreal Canadiens for Chris Higgins, Ryan McDonagh, Pavel Valentenko and Doug Janik.

On November 5, 2009, he made his NHL debut against the Boston Bruins. On February 10, 2010 he scored his first NHL goal and assist on Michal Neuvirth of the Washington Capitals in a 6–5 Montreal Canadiens overtime win.

Pyatt became an unrestricted free agent after the 2010–11 season and on July 6, 2011, he signed a one-year deal with the Tampa Bay Lightning. On January 9, 2012, he signed a two-year extension with the Lightning.

On August 4, 2014, he agreed to a one-year contract with an optional second season with Genève-Servette HC of the National League (NL), to play alongside his brother, Taylor. On December 31, 2014, he won the 2014 Spengler Cup with Geneva.

On June 24, 2015, the Eagles activated his option for a second season in Calvin's city. He was selected to play for Team Canada at the 2015 Spengler Cup. He scored 4 points in 4 games en route to his second Spengler Cup title. He was a healthy scratch for the first round of the 2016 playoffs against Fribourg, and made his playoffs debut in game 2 of the second round against Lugano.

On May 24, 2016, the Ottawa Senators signed him to a one-year, two-way contract valued at $800,000 in the NHL and $200,000 in the AHL. This resulted in Pyatt being reunited with head coach Guy Boucher for the third time, who previously coached Pyatt when he was with both the Hamilton Bulldogs and Tampa Bay Lightning.

On June 26, 2017, Pyatt agreed to a two-year contract extension with the Senators worth $2.2 million.

In the 2018–19 season, while in the final year of his contract with the Senators, Pyatt regressed in posting just 2 assists in 37 games before he was placed on waivers on January 1, 2019. After clearing waivers, he was assigned to the AHL, however before he could report he was traded by the Senators, along with Mike McKenna and a 2019 sixth round pick, to the Vancouver Canucks in exchange for Anders Nilsson and Darren Archibald on January 2, 2019. He was assigned to continue in the AHL with affiliate, the Utica Comets. Adding a veteran presence with the Comets, Pyatt contributed offensively with 6 goals and 19 points in 36 games.

At the 2019 NHL Entry Draft, on June 22, 2019, Pyatt's NHL rights were included in a trade by the Canucks to the San Jose Sharks for an exchange of draft selections and Francis Perron. Un-signed by the Sharks, Pyatt returned to Europe as a free agent in securing a one-year contract with Swedish club, Skellefteå AIK of the SHL, on July 26, 2019.

On February 6, 2020, Pyatt parted ways with Skelleftea AIK to join the SC Rapperswil-Jona Lakers in the National League (NL) for the remainder of the season. He played 8 regular season games with the team, putting up 3 points, before becoming a free agent. Pyatt eventually retired from professional hockey following his short stint with the Lakers.

Personal life
Pyatt has two brothers, including Taylor Pyatt, a former NHL player.

He married his longtime girlfriend, Mallory, in the summer of 2015.

Pyatt and his wife Mallory had their first baby in December 2020.

International play
During his third OHL season with the Saginaw Spirit, Pyatt was chosen to represent Team Canada at the 2006 World Junior Championships in Vancouver, helping them to a gold medal as the tournament host country.  The next year, he returned to Team Canada for the 2007 World Junior Championships in Leksand.  Pyatt helped Canada defeat Russia 4–2 in the final to capture his second straight gold medal (as well as Canada's third consecutive gold medal of a five-year run).

Career statistics

Regular season and playoffs

International

Awards and honors

References

External links

1987 births
Canadian expatriate ice hockey players in Sweden
Canadian expatriate ice hockey players in Switzerland
Canadian expatriate ice hockey players in the United States
Canadian ice hockey centres
Charlotte Checkers (1993–2010) players
Genève-Servette HC players
Hamilton Bulldogs (AHL) players
Hartford Wolf Pack players
Ice hockey people from Ontario
Living people
Montreal Canadiens players
New York Rangers draft picks
Ottawa Senators players
Saginaw Spirit players
SC Rapperswil-Jona Lakers players
Skellefteå AIK players
Sportspeople from Thunder Bay
Tampa Bay Lightning players
Utica Comets players